Kelly Goldsmith is an American marketing researcher who specializes in consumer behavior and a former reality television contestant. She is currently the E. Bronson Ingram Chair and Professor of marketing at the Owen Graduate School of Management at Vanderbilt University.

Career
Goldsmith was born and raised in San Diego, California. Her father, Marshall Goldsmith, is an executive leadership coach. She graduated from Duke University in 2001 with a B.A. in sociology. Goldsmith obtained her Ph.D., M. Phil. and M.A. in marketing from Yale University completing her studies in 2009. After graduation she worked as an associate professor at Northwestern University's Kellogg School of Management.

Goldsmith has been an associate professor of marketing at the Owen Graduate School of Management at Vanderbilt University since 2017. Her areas of research include human responses to scarcity and uncertainty. She has appeared as a commentator in numerous publications on the topic of consumer panic buying in relation to COVID-19. She previously gave a talk in TedxNashville talk in 2019 titled "How to make the most out of not having enough". She has also served on the editorial boards of Journal of Marketing Research and the Journal of Consumer Research.

Survivor
In 2001, Goldsmith appeared as a contestant on the third season of the American television reality show Survivor as part of the cast of Survivor: Africa. She was eliminated on Day 24 after being falsely accused of casting a prior vote against fellow contestant Lex van den Berghe. She finished in ninth place and was the first member of the jury. In her Final Tribal Council vote, she voted for Ethan Zohn to win.

Goldsmith later became a casting director for CBS and helped build the cast of Survivor: Vanuatu, Survivor's ninth season.

Personal life
After Survivor: Africa, Goldsmith married Reid Shriner. Together, they have twin children.

Select publications

References

External links

Women social scientists
Survivor (American TV series) contestants
Yale University alumni
Vanderbilt University faculty
Living people
People from San Diego
Duke University alumni
Year of birth missing (living people)
Participants in American reality television series